The Second Treatise of the Great Seth is a Gnostic text. It is the second tractate in Codex VII of the Nag Hammadi library. The Coptic papyrus, translated from a Greek original, is entirely preserved and written clearly. The text likely was written near Alexandria c. 200 AD. Seth is not mentioned in the text; instead the title "may be understood to be the second speech or message delivered by Jesus, the manifestation of heavenly Seth," based on Sethian beliefs. Like the Gnostic Apocalypse of Peter, the text takes a docetic view of the crucifixion of Jesus with the statement that Jesus "did not die in reality but in appearance." Although the heresiologist Irenaeus criticized the supposed Gnostic belief that Simon of Cyrene was a substitute who was crucified instead of Jesus, the text of Second Treatise of the Great Seth, in context, says, "It was another, their father, who drank the gall and the vinegar; it was not I. They struck me with the reed; it was another, Simon, who bore the cross on his shoulder. It was another upon whom they placed the crown of thorns." The text also encourages unity among Gnostics, assuring them that Jesus will help them overcome the false rulers and their followers.

Summary
The text is written from the perspective of Jesus. In it, Jesus reflects on the nature of reality and the existence of a perfect deity, who is at rest in the truth and ineffable light. He speaks about the word of the deity, the thought of the imperishable spirit, and the idea of dying with Christ. He visits a bodily dwelling and reveals himself to be a stranger from above the heavens, causing the rulers of the earthly area to become troubled. Some are persuaded by the wonders he accomplishes, while others flee and bring punishment upon him. The rulers are unable to recognize the true father of truth and the human of greatness, but instead, they take the name out of ignorance. Jesus died because of those who offered praise, but not really, because the archangel was vacuous.

Jesus describes the voice of the world ruler who claims to be the only god, causing Jesus to laugh. He has a single emanation from the eternal and unknowable ones, places a small thought in the world, and visits the angels with fire and flame, causing a disturbance and a fight around the seraphim and cherubim. Jesus says that he did not die in reality but in appearance, and the ignorant ones who punished him condemned themselves. He assumed different shapes and passed by the gates of the angels without being seen, mingled with them, and tramped on those who were harsh. He brought the son of the majesty to the height and revealed the three ways to a perfect bridal chamber of the heavens. His cross was rejected by the world, and after they nailed him to the cross, darkness overtook the world. The veil of the temple was torn, and the souls that were in the sleep below were released.

Jesus criticizes the rulers for not understanding the truth about the ineffable union between the children of light and for instead promoting a doctrine of fear, slavery, and worldly worship. He contrasts the rulers with those who have nothing but desire the truth, and those who live in harmony and love, which is the universal and perfect love. Jesus also speaks of Adam, Abraham, Isaac, Jacob, David, Solomon, the twelve prophets, and Moses, who were all made to be a laughingstock by the realm of seven, and that they never truly knew Jesus or his brothers. The ruler is also criticized for claiming to be god and bringing sin upon generations, but Jesus and his brothers are innocent and have overcome the ruler's false teachings. Jesus addresses those who do not see their blindness, having never known the truth or listened to a reliable report, leading them to a judgment of error.

In the conclusion, Jesus describes himself as the despised human son. The text emphasizes the importance of unity among Gnostics and the avoidance of negative qualities such as jealousy, division, anger, and fear. Jesus is depicted as a mystery who, along with others, was spiritually married in union before the foundation of the world. The text also mentions that the rulers around Yaldabaoth were disobedient due to their envy, but Jesus is a friend of Sophia and is a member of the children of truth and greatness. The ending encourages the readers to rest with Jesus, his fellow spirits, and his brothers and sisters, forever.

References

S The Second Treatise of the Great Seth
Apocalyptic literature
3rd-century Christian texts
Denial of the crucifixion of Jesus
Treatises
First-person narrative fiction
Nag Hammadi library